This is a list of energy storage power plants worldwide, other than pumped hydro storage. 
Many individual energy storage plants augment electrical grids by capturing excess electrical energy during periods of low demand and storing it in other forms until needed on an electrical grid. The energy is later converted back to its electrical form and returned to the grid as needed.
Most of the world's grid energy storage by capacity is in the form of pumped-storage hydroelectricity, which is covered in List of pumped-storage hydroelectric power stations. 
This article list plants using all other forms of energy storage.

Another energy storage method is the consumption of surplus or low-cost energy (typically during night time) for conversion into resources such as hot water, cool water or ice, which is then used for heating or cooling at other times when electricity is in higher demand and at greater cost per kilowatt hour (kWh). Such thermal energy storage is often employed at end-user sites such as large buildings, and also as part of district heating, thus shifting energy consumption to other times for better balancing of supply and demand.

For a list of systems and forms of energy storage see energy storage and grid energy storage.

Largest energy storage plants 

Table is by default sorted by operational storage capacity in MWh. Minimum capacity for inclusion is either 30 MWh or 30 MW, with a minimum of 1 hour of storage.

Under construction

Largest thermal energy storage plants

Largest by technology

See also 

 Battery storage power station
 Distributed generation
 Energy Reduction Assets
 Grid energy storage
 Hybrid power
 Outline of energy
 List of pumped-storage hydroelectric power stations
 Power transmission

References 

 This article contains text from the United States Department of Energy, DOE Energy Storage Database, a work in the public domain.

External links 

 U.S. Dept of Energy - Energy Storage Systems 
 U.S. Dept of Energy - Energy Storage Systems Database
 The world's pumped storage plants. 
 Stations de pompage turbinage dans le monde

 
Energy-related lists
Lists related to renewable energy
Lists of power stations